Paruppusilli (Tamil: பருப்புஉசிலி) is a traditional Tamil dish. It is made by frying toor dal and bengal gram dal with red chillies and french beans/cluster beans/plantain flowers, and is flavored with asafoetida, curry leaves and mustard seeds. It is typically served with rice and morkuzhambu during a meal.

See also
 Cuisine of Tamil Nadu

References

External links

Tamil cuisine